Sociedad Deportiva Compostela is a Spanish football team based in Santiago de Compostela, in the autonomous community of Galicia. They play home matches at Estadio Multiusos de San Lázaro, and compete in Segunda División RFEF, the fourth tier of the football league pyramid in Spain.

History

A team called Compostela Foot-ball Club was founded in 1928, ceasing to exist in 1946. On June 26, 1962 a new team is created called Sociedad Recreativa Compostela, and on October 28, 1962, the newly formed SR Compostela merged with another team, Club Arenal, changing names to Sociedad Deportiva Compostela. The decade of the 1970s was irregular. The team played in the Tercera División, in the Regional category and in the new Segunda División B. Its first promotion to a semi-national stage occurred in 1977, with a promotion to Segunda División B (Group 1), which lasted just one season; Compos promoted again in 1980, this time lasting six years.

Relegation in 1986 was compounded by off-field controversy surrounding the actions of then president Francisco Steppe. He resigned amid allegations of receipt of payments to throw a game against Pontevedra CF, which would assure the opposition's maintenance in the category. The late 1980s saw a significant restructuring of the club both at board and management levels and, in 1990, Compostela regained third-level status.

The following campaign was to prove the club's most successful to date. On 23 June 1991, a capacity crowd of 8,000 at the Estadio Municipal Santa Isabel, saw goals from Juanito and Ochoa (two) clinch a 3–1 victory in the final play-off match against CD Badajoz, for a first-ever Segunda División visit.

The move to Estadio Multiusos de San Lázaro coincided with the continuing rise in the team's fortunes and, at the end of 1993–94, following a 3–1 play-off victory against Rayo Vallecano, Compostela reached La Liga. Compostela did remarkably well, and reached a best finish of 10th in 1995–96, mainly courtesy of strikers Christopher Ohen and Bent Christensen, whom totalled 23 league goals.

After four seasons at the top, Compostela was relegated after losing a relegation play-off match to Villarreal CF on the away goals rule, despite playing overall attractive football. The club was also about to start a downward spiral; after a relegation to the third level in 2001 the team returned the following year but, in the following campaign, played to a backdrop of off-field distractions, with the players and staff going unpaid for months – a final ninth place was not enough to prevent another relegation, as the club failed to meet the 31 July deadline to settle all wage debts.

Off-field problems
In the 2001–02 season economic problems arose. However, the squad with Luis Ángel Duque as coach managed to achieve promotion to the Segunda División. Off-field problems continued in 2003–04, with the pinnacle being the players, who had not been paid in several months, refusing to appear for a fixture at UB Conquense, with the subsequent loss of three points. At the season's close, after the actual relegation, Compostela dropped further to the Galician Regional Preferente (north) after failing again to meet the financial deadline. They played there for two seasons, and folded after the 2005-06 season, when a judge dissolved the institution in the summer of 2006, and auctioned all the club's properties, including the brand name, the trophies and the team's spot in the league. Finally, 26 January 2011, after everything was sold out, the court published the legal liquidation of the entity.

Re-organisation

Previously to SD Compostela's liquidation in 2006, a new club was created on June 1st, 2004, with the name SD Campus Stellae, with José Luís Balboa as president. They entered competition in the 2005-06 season at the group 11 of the Galicia Terceira Autonómica league, where he finishes in 11th position (out of 18 teams). The following season, 2006-07, they played in group 12 of the same division, and finished third out of 14 teams.

In 2006, a former president of the dissolved SD Compostela, José María Caneda, bought the commercial name Sociedad Deportiva Compostela, and became president of the SD Campus Stellae, changing the team's name at the beginning of the 2007-08 season to the former club's brand. 
 
In the 2007–08 season, the new club won its Preferente league and returned to Tercera. In the following campaign, after finishing first in its group, the team beat Atlético Monzón with a 4–2 aggregate (3–0, 1–2) and won a second consecutive promotion. However, this would be a short-lived return, with relegation befalling at the season's end, immediately followed by another one due to overwhelming financial problems. Longtime president José María Caneda left the club.

Season-by-season records

SD Compostela SAD (1962–2007)

4 seasons in La Liga
7 seasons in Segunda División
10 seasons in Segunda División B
16 seasons in Tercera División (10 as third tier, 6 as fourth tier)

SD Compostela (2005–)

5 seasons in Segunda División B
2 seasons in Segunda División RFEF
6 seasons in Tercera División

Honours
Tercera División: 2008–09, 2017–18, 2019–20

Current squad

Famous players
Note: this list includes players that have appeared in at least 100 league games and/or have reached international status.

Famous managers
 Fernando Castro Santos
 Fernando Vázquez

Stadium

Compostela play at the Estadio Multiusos de San Lázaro, which has a capacity of 16,666. Pitch dimensions are 105 x 68 metres.

Compostela played their first season at Estadio da Residencia da Universidade de Santiago de Compostela, whilst work was completed on their first permanent ground, Estadio Municipal de Santa Isabel; on 22 September 1963, it played the first match at the new stadium. It was a basic enclosure and lacked a covered stand until 1969, when a tribune was erected and floodlights installed at a cost of 1 million pesetas. Compostela continued to use the ground for first team fixtures until the end of the 1993 season. The reserve team, Compostela B, played on at Santa Isabel until early 2003, when the ground was finally demolished and replaced with a municipal sports centre that bore the same name.

Work started on the Multiusos de San Lázaro in 1991. Situated in the eastern suburb of San Lázaro, it was a multi-purpose arena, used primarily for the football matches of its two resident clubs, Compostela and SD Ciudad de Santiago. Oval in shape and with a terracotta-coloured roof on the west side to incorporate the directors' seating and press facilities on a second tier, the pitch was surrounded by a 400m athletics track, relatively uncommon in Spanish stadiums.

The inaugural match took place on 24 June 1993, when a four-way tournament was staged, featuring Deportivo de La Coruña, CD Tenerife, Club Atlético River Plate and São Paulo FC. Deportivo and River played in the first match, and Bebeto had the honour of scoring the first goal.

See also
1995–96 La Liga, best season in the history of the club.

References

External links
Official website 
Futbolme team profile 
Club blog 

 
Football clubs in Galicia (Spain)
Association football clubs established in 2004
Sport in Santiago de Compostela
1962 establishments in Spain
Association football clubs established in 1962
Segunda División clubs
La Liga clubs